, also referred to as , is the 14th highest mountain and second highest volcano in Japan (after Mount Fuji) at . It is included in 100 Famous Japanese Mountains.

Description
Ontake is a major sacred mountain, and following older shamanistic practices, actors and artists have gone to the mountain to put themselves into trances in order to get divine inspiration for their creative activities.

Eruptions

Ontake was thought to be inactive until October 1979, when it underwent a series of explosive phreatic eruptions which ejected 200,000 tons of ash, and had a volcanic explosivity index (VEI) of 2. There were minor non-explosive (VEI 0) phreatic eruptions in 1991 and 2007.

On Saturday, September 27, 2014, at around 11:53 a.m. Japan Standard Time (UTC +9), the volcano erupted with a VEI of 3. There were no significant earthquakes that might have warned authorities in the lead up to the phreatic eruption—caused by ground water flashing to steam in a hydrothermal explosion. The Mount Ontake volcano eruption was an extremely rare phenomenon which made it difficult to take precautionary measures. At the time of the eruption, several hiking parties were undertaking ascents and descents of Ontake, with emergency descents having to be undertaken in the presence of ash clouds and falling rocks. 63 people were killed; five bodies were never found. The Japan Self-Defense Forces began carrying out helicopter searches for missing people after the eruption.

Gallery

See also
 100 Famous Japanese Mountains
 List of mountains in Japan
 List of Ultras of Japan
 List of volcanoes in Japan
 Ontake Prefectural Natural Park
 Three-thousanders (in Japan)
 OSJ Ontake SkyRace

References

External links 

 Ontakesan - Japan Meteorological Agency 
  - Japan Meteorological Agency
 Ontakesan - Smithsonian Institution: Global Volcanism Program

Volcanic crater lakes
Mountains of Gifu Prefecture
Mountains of Nagano Prefecture
Sacred mountains of Japan
Volcanoes of Honshū
Volcanoes of Gifu Prefecture
Volcanoes of Nagano Prefecture